Events from the year 1939 in the United States.

Incumbents

Federal Government 
 President: Franklin D. Roosevelt (D-New York)
 Vice President: John Nance Garner (D-Texas)
 Chief Justice: Charles Evans Hughes (New York)
 Speaker of the House of Representatives: William B. Bankhead (D-Alabama)
 Senate Majority Leader: Alben W. Barkley (D-Kentucky)
 Congress: 75th (until January 3), 76th (starting January 3)

Events

January
 January 1 
The Hewlett-Packard Company is founded in Palo Alto, California. 
Texas A&M University wins its only football national championship.
 January 5 – Pioneer aviator Amelia Earhart is officially declared dead after her 1937 disappearance.

February
 February 6 – Raymond Chandler's hardboiled California private detective Philip Marlowe is introduced in his first full-length work of crime fiction, The Big Sleep, published by Alfred A. Knopf.
 February 15 – John Ford's Western film Stagecoach starring John Wayne premieres in New York City and Los Angeles.
 February 18 – The Golden Gate International Exposition opens in San Francisco.
 February 20 –  A Nazi rally at Madison Square Garden is organized by the German American Bund in New York City. More than 20,000 people attend and Fritz Julius Kuhn is a featured speaker.
 February 21 – The Golden Gate International Exposition opens in San Francisco.
 February 23 – The 11th Academy Awards are presented at Biltmore Hotel in Los Angeles without an official host, with Frank Capra's You Can't Take It with You winning the Academy Award for Outstanding Production. The film is receives the most nominations with seven, with Capra winning his third Best Director award. Michael Curtiz and William Keighley's The Adventures of Robin Hood receives the most awards with three.
 February 27 – Sitdown strikes are outlawed by the Supreme Court of the United States.

March
 March 3 – Students at Harvard University demonstrate the new tradition of swallowing goldfish to reporters.
 March 22 – Undefeated LIU Brooklyn Blackbirds men's basketball team tops undefeated Loyola of Chicago in the championship game of the second annual National Invitation Tournament, 44–32. LIU's 24–0 final record is the first perfect season of college basketball's postseason tournament era.
 March 28 – American adventurer Richard Halliburton delivers a last message from a Chinese junk, before he disappears on a voyage across the Pacific Ocean.

April
 April 9 – African-American singer Marian Anderson performs before 75,000 people at the Lincoln Memorial in Washington, D.C., after having been denied the use both of Constitution Hall by the Daughters of the American Revolution, and of a public high school by the federally controlled District of Columbia. First Lady Eleanor Roosevelt resigns from the DAR because of their decision.
 April 10 – Alcoholics Anonymous ("The Big Book") is first published.
 April 14 – John Steinbeck's novel The Grapes of Wrath is first published.
 April 16 – The Boston Bruins defeat the Toronto Maple Leafs in the fifth and final game of the Stanley Cup Finals to capture their second championship in ice hockey.
 April 30 – The 1939 New York World's Fair opens.

May
 May 1 – Batman makes his first appearance in Detective Comics #27.
 May 2 – Major League Baseball's Lou Gehrig, the legendary Yankee first baseman known as "The Iron Horse", ends his 2,130 consecutive games played streak after contracting amyotrophic lateral sclerosis. The record stands for 56 years before Cal Ripken Jr. plays 2,131 consecutive games.
 May 20 – Pan American Airways begins trans-Atlantic mail service with the inaugural flight of its Boeing 314 flying boat Yankee Clipper from Port Washington, New York to Marseille.

June
 June – Superman (comic book) begins publication.
 June 4 – The , a ship carrying a cargo of 907 Jewish refugees, is denied permission to land in Florida after already having been turned away from Cuba. Forced to return to Europe, many of the passengers later die in Nazi death camps during the Holocaust.
 June 6 – The first Little League Baseball game is played in Williamsport, Pennsylvania.
 June 7 – British King George IV and Queen Elizabeth cross the Canadian border into the United States being the first reigning British monarch to visit the United States.
 June 12 – The National Baseball Hall of Fame and Museum is officially dedicated in Cooperstown, New York.
 June 21 – The New York Yankees announce first baseman Lou Gehrig's retirement, after doctors reveal he has amyotrophic lateral sclerosis.

July
 July 2
 The 1st World Science Fiction Convention opens in New York City.
 The newly-sculpted head of Theodore Roosevelt is dedicated at Mount Rushmore, by Harlan J. Bushfield and William S. Hart.
 July 4 – Lou Gehrig gives his "Farewell to Baseball" speech at Yankee Stadium. In it, he says, "Today, I consider myself the luckiest man on the face of the earth."
 July 8 – The Pan American Airways Boeing 314 flying boat Yankee Clipper inaugurates the world's first heavier-than-air North Atlantic air passenger service between the United States (Port Washington, New York) and Britain.

August
 August 2 – The Einstein–Szilard letter is signed by Albert Einstein on Long Island, advising President of the United States Franklin D. Roosevelt of the potential use of uranium to construct an atomic bomb. It is delivered on October 11 and leads to the first meeting on October 21 of the Advisory Committee on Uranium and ultimately to the Manhattan Project.
 August 15 – MGM's classic color musical film The Wizard of Oz, based on L. Frank Baum's famous novel, and starring Judy Garland as Dorothy, premieres at Grauman's Chinese Theatre in Hollywood. On August 25 it is released in movie theaters throughout the United States.

September
 September 3 – World War II: SS Athenia, a British ocean liner is torpedoed by a German submarine off the Irish coast with 30 Americans onboard dying.
 September 5 – World War II: The United States declares its neutrality in the war.
 September 11 – Mark Twain National Forest is established in Missouri.
 September 21 – WJSV broadcast day: Radio station WJSV in Washington, D.C. records an entire broadcast day for preservation in the National Archives.
 September 29 – Gerald J. Cox, speaking at an American Water Works Association meeting, becomes the first person to publicly propose the fluoridation of public water supplies in the United States.
 September 30 – 1939 Waynesburg vs. Fordham football game, the first televised American football game, between college teams Fordham University and Waynesburg College at Randall's Island, New York.

October
 October 8 – The New York Yankees defeat the Cincinnati Reds in the fourth and final game of the World Series, to capture their fourth consecutive championship in baseball.
 October 15 – The New York Municipal Airport (later renamed La Guardia Airport) is dedicated.
 October 17 – Comedy-drama film Mr. Smith Goes to Washington premieres in Washington, D.C.
 October 24 – Nylon stockings go on sale for the first time anywhere in Wilmington, Delaware.
 October 25 – The Time of Your Life, a drama by William Saroyan, debuts in New York City.

November
 November 4 – World War II: U.S. President Franklin D. Roosevelt signs the Neutrality Act of 1939 into law. The arms embargo previously put into place by the Neutrality Act of 1937 is lifted and put any trade with nations engaged in war under cash-and-carry grounds. American ships and planes are prohibited as part of the Act from visiting any belligerent state in a war along with transporting anything.
 November 6 – Hedda Hopper's Hollywood debuts on radio with Hollywood gossip columnist Hedda Hopper as host (the show runs until 1951, making Hopper a powerful figure in the Hollywood elite).
 November 8 – CBS television station W2XAB resumes test transmission with an all-electronic system broadcast from the top of the Chrysler Building in New York City.
 November 15 – In Washington, D.C., U.S. President Franklin D. Roosevelt lays the cornerstone of the Jefferson Memorial.

December
 December 2 – La Guardia Airport opens for business in New York City.
 December 15 – The film Gone with the Wind, starring Vivien Leigh, Clark Gable, Olivia de Havilland and Leslie Howard, premieres at Loew's Grand Theatre in Atlanta, Georgia. It is based on Margaret Mitchell's best-selling novel. It is the longest American film made up to this time (nearly four hours).
 December 22 – The second cel-animated feature film and the first produced by an American studio other than Walt Disney Productions, Gulliver's Travels (by Fleischer Studios, and very loosely based upon the book by Jonathan Swift), is released.
 December 29 – The prototype of the Consolidated B-24 Liberator bomber first flies.

Undated

 Sandia View Academy, a private Adventist school, is founded in Corrales, New Mexico,
 General Motors introduces the Hydra-Matic drive, the first mass-produced, fully automatic transmission, as an option in 1940 model year Oldsmobile automobiles.
 Construction of Fallingwater, designed by Frank Lloyd Wright, is completed.
 A logging crew sets off the second of three major forest fires in the Tillamook Burn of Oregon, which destroys .

Ongoing
 New Deal (1933–1939)

Births

January

 January 3 – Gene Summers, American rock 'n' roll singer (member of Rockabilly Hall of Fame)
 January 8 – Ruth Maleczech, American actress (d. 2013)
 January 9 – Jimmy Boyd, American singer, musician and actor (d. 2009)
 January 10
 David Horowitz, American conservative writer
 William Levy, American-Dutch journalist, author and poet (d. 2019)  
 Sal Mineo, American actor (d. 1976)
 Bill Toomey, American athlete
 January 12
 William Lee Golden, American country and gospel singer, member of the Oak Ridge Boys
 Jim Palosaari, American evangelist (d. 2011)
 January 13 – Paul Henderson, journalist and winner of the Pulitzer Prize for Investigative Reporting (d. 2018)
 January 16 – Mac Curtis, American singer (d. 2013)
 January 17 – Maury Povich, American talk show host
 January 18 – Bo Gritz, U.S. Presidential candidate
 January 19 – Phil Everly, American rock 'n' roll musician (member of Rockabilly Hall of Fame) (d. 2014)
 January 20 – Paul Coverdell, American politician (d. 2000)
 January 27 – Julius Lester, American civil rights activist, writer, musician, photographer and professor (d. 2018)
 January 29 – Ray Stevens, American musician
 January 31 – Jerry Brudos, American serial killer (d. 2006)

February

 February 1 – Joe Sample, American pianist, keyboardist and composer (d. 2014)
 February 3 – Michael Cimino, American film director (d. 2016)
 February 4 – Stan Lundine, American politician
 February 6
 Mike Farrell, American actor
 Augie Garrido, American baseball player, coach (d. 2018)
 February 9
 Red Lane, American singer-songwriter (d. 2015)
 Barry Mann, American songwriter
 February 10 – Barbara Kolb, American composer
 February 11
 Gerry Goffin, American lyricist (d. 2014)
 Jane Yolen, American writer and poet
 February 12
 John D. Hancock, American actor and film director
 Ray Manzarek, American keyboardist (The Doors) (d. 2013)
 February 14 – Blowfly, American musician, songwriter and record producer (d. 2016)
 February 15 – Robert Hansen, American serial killer (d. 2014)
 February 18 – Dal Maxvill, American baseball player and manager
 February 20 – Herbert Kohler Jr., American businessman (d. 2022)
 February 23 – Rachel Elkind-Tourre, American record producer
 February 25 – John Leonard, American literary, television, film and cultural critic (d. 2008)
 February 26 – Clark Coolidge, American poet
 February 27 – Peter Revson, American race car driver (d. 1974)
 February 28 – Tommy Tune, American dancer, choreographer and actor

March

 March 2 – Manch Wheeler, American footballer (died 2018)
 March 4 – Jack Fisher, baseball pitcher
 March 6 – Kit Bond, politician
 March 9 – Malcolm Bricklin, automotive pioneer
 March 12 – Johnny Callison, baseball player (died 2006)
 March 13 – Neil Sedaka, singer-songwriter
 March 14 – William B. Lenoir, astronaut (died 2010)
 March 15 – Ted Kaufman, politician
 March 17 – Jim Gary, sculptor (died 2006)
 March 25 – Toni Cade Bambara, African-American writer (died 1995)
 March 27 – Cale Yarborough, race car driver
 March 29 – Jonathan Daniels, civil rights leader and Episcopal seminarist (died 1965)

April

 April 1 – Phil Niekro, American baseball player (d. 2020)
 April 2 – Marvin Gaye, African-American R&B singer-songwriter and record producer (k. 1984)
 April 4
 JoAnne Carner, American professional golfer
 Ernie Terrell, African-American professional boxer (d. 2014)
 April 5 – Ronald White, American musician (d. 1995)
 April 7 – Francis Ford Coppola, American film director
 April 8 – Elizabeth Clare Prophet, American writer (d. 2009)
 April 9 – George Harrison, American competition swimmer (d. 2011)
 April 10 – Alan Rothenberg, American lawyer and sports executive
 April 11 – Louise Lasser, American actress
 April 13 – Paul Sorvino, American actor (d. 2022)
 April 16 – John Delafose, American Zydeco accordionist (d. 1994)
 April 22 – Jason Miller, American playwright, actor (d. 2001)
 April 23
 David Birney, American actor and director (d. 2022)
 Lee Majors, American actor
 Ray Peterson, American singer (d. 2005)

May

 May 1
 Judy Collins, American singer-songwriter
 Max Robinson, American journalist and academic (d. 1988)
 May 4 – Paul Gleason, American actor (d. 2006)
 May 8 – Paul Drayton, American Olympic athlete (d. 2010)
 May 9 
 James M. Bardeen, American physicist (d. 2022)
 Ralph Boston, American athlete
 May 11 – Milt Pappas, American baseball player (d. 2016)
 May 12 – Ron Ziegler, White House Press Secretary (d. 2003)
 May 13 – Harvey Keitel, American actor
 May 15 – Barbara Hammer, American filmmaker (d. 2019)
 May 19
 Sonny Fortune, American jazz musician (d. 2018)
 Nancy Kwan, American actress
 Dick Scobee, American astronaut (d. 1986)
 May 22 – Paul Winfield, African-American actor (d. 2004)
 May 25 – Dixie Carter, American actress (d. 2010)
 May 26 
 Brent Musburger, American sports announcer
 Herb Trimpe, American author and illustrator (d. 2015)
 May 27 
 Marilyn McLeod, American songwriter (d. 2021)
 Don Williams, American country singer (d. 2017)
 May 29 – Al Unser, American race car driver
 May 30 – Michael J. Pollard, American actor

June

 June 2 – John Schlee, American golfer (d. 2000)
 June 6 – Marian Wright Edelman, American activist, founder of Children's Defense Fund
 June 8
 Herb Adderley, American football player (d. 2020)
 Bernie Casey, African-American football player and actor (d. 2017)
 Ruthe Blalock Jones, American painter
 June 11
 Wilma Burgess, American country music singer (d. 2003)
 Christina Crawford, American author and actress
 June 14 – Tom Matte, American football player (d. 2021)
 June 16 – Billy "Crash" Craddock, American country and rockabilly singer
 June 18 – Lou Brock, African-American baseball player (d. 2020)
 June 19 – John F. MacArthur, American pastor
 June 20 – Bob Neuwirth, American singer-songwriter (d. 2022)
 June 21 – Charles Boone, American composer
 June 24
 Stephen Dunn, American poet (d. 2021)
 Henry L. Garrett III, American politician
 June 25
 Curtis McClinton, American football player
 Barbara Montgomery, American actress
 June 26 – Chuck Robb, American politician
 June 27 – Brereton C. Jones, American politician
 June 28
 Wally English, American football coach
 Jack Harbaugh, American football player, coach
 June 30 – Martin A. Herman, American politician

July

 July 1 – Frank Parker, American actor (d. 2018)
 July 2
 Mike Castle, American attorney, politician
 John H. Sununu, American politician
 July 4
 Lee Folkins, American football tight end
 George Vecsey, American journalist, sportswriter
 July 5 – Booker Edgerson, American football player
 July 6 – Bruce Hunter, American competition swimmer (d. 2018)
 July 10 – Mavis Staples, African-American R&B and gospel singer, actress and civil rights activist
 July 11
 Stephen Berger, American entrepreneur, investment banker, civil servant and political advisor
 Larry Laoretti, American golfer
 July 12
 Barbara Crossette, American journalist, author
 Arlen Ness, American motorcycle designer, entrepreneur (d. 2019)
 July 13 – Clara Leach Adams-Ender, U.S. Army officer
 July 14
 Sid Haig, American actor (d. 2019)
 George E. Slusser, American scholar, writer (d. 2014)
 July 15 – Patrick Wayne, actor
 July 16
 William Bell, American soul singer-songwriter
 Denise LaSalle, African-American blues and R&B/soul singer-songwriter and record producer (d. 2018)
 July 18 – Dion DiMucci, American singer-songwriter
 July 20 – Judy Chicago, American feminist artist
 July 21 – John Negroponte, U.S. Director of National Intelligence
 July 22 – Raul Yzaguirre, American civil rights activist
 July 26 – Bob Lilly, American football player
 July 27 
 Irv Cross, American football player and sportscaster (d. 2021)
 William Eggleston, American photographer
 July 30 – Peter Bogdanovich, American film director  (d. 2022)
 July 31 – Susan Flannery, American soap opera actress

August

 August 1
 Terry Kiser, American actor
 Robert James Waller, American novelist (d. 2017)
 August 2
 Benjamin Barber, American political theorist, author (d. 2017)
 Wes Craven, American film director, writer (d. 2015)
 John W. Snow, 73rd United States Secretary of the Treasury
 August 4 – Frankie Ford, American singer (d. 2015)
 August 8 – Arthur Riggs, geneticist (died 2022)
 August 9 – The Mighty Hannibal, singer-songwriter and record producer (died 2014)
 August 12
 Skip Caray, baseball broadcaster (died 2008)
 Charley Frazier, football player (died 2022)
 George Hamilton, actor
 David Jacobs, producer, writer
 August 13 – Howard Tate, soul singer-songwriter (died 2011)
 August 16
 Billy Joe Shaver, country singer-songwriter (died 2020)
 Eric Weissberg, folk musician (died 2020)
 August 18
 Molly Bee, country music singer (died 2009)
 Johnny Preston, singer (died 2011)
 August 21 – Clarence Williams III, African-American actor (The Mod Squad) (died 2021)
 August 22
 Sally Grossman, model (died 2021)
 Valerie Harper, actress (died 2019)
 Fred Milano, doo-wop singer (died 2012)
 Carl Yastrzemski, baseball player
 August 27 – Bill Mulliken, competition swimmer (d. 2014)
 August 29 – Joel Schumacher, film producer and director (d. 2020)
 August 30 – Elizabeth Ashley, actress

September

 September 1 – Lily Tomlin, American actress and comedian
 September 5
 Donna Anderson, American actress
 Claudette Colvin, American civil rights activist and nurse
 William Devane, American actor
 John Stewart, American folk musician (d. 2008)
 September 6
 Brigid Berlin, American actress, artist
 Dan Cragg, American science-fiction author
 David Allan Coe, American country singer-songwriter and musician
 September 7 – S. David Griggs, American astronaut (d. 1989)
 September 9 – Ron McDole, American football player
 September 10 – Greg Mullavey, American actor
 September 11 – Charles Geschke, American inventor and businessman
 September 12 
 Phillip Ramey, American composer
 Henry Waxman, American politician
 September 13 – Richard Kiel, American actor (d. 2014)
 September 17 – David Souter, Associate Justice of the Supreme Court of the United States
 September 20 – Michu Meszaros, Hungarian-born American actor (ALF) (d. 2016)
 September 22
 Gilbert E. Patterson, American minister and bishop (d. 2007)
 Tim Wirth, American politician
 September 24
 Mark Elliott, voice-over artist for the Walt Disney Company
 Wayne Henderson, American trombonist, record producer (d. 2014)
 Patrick Kearney, American serial killer
 September 25 – David S. Mann, American lawyer, politician
 September 26 – Judith Appelbaum, American editor, consultant and author (d. 2018)
 September 27 – Kathy Whitworth, American professional golfer (d. 2022)
 September 29 – Larry Linville, American actor (M*A*S*H) (d. 2000)

October

 October 1
 George Archer, American golfer (d. 2005)
 Mariah A. Taylor, founder of the North Portland Nurse Practitioner Community Health Clinic
 October 6 – Ellen Travolta, American actress
 October 7
 John Hopcroft, American computer scientist
 Bill Snyder, American football coach
 October 8 – Lynne Stewart, American defense attorney (d. 2017)
 October 9 
 Willie Morrow, American businessman and inventor (d. 2022)
 O. V. Wright, American singer (d. 1980)
 October 12 – Carolee Schneemann, American visual artist (d. 2019)
 October 13 
 T. J. Cloutier, American poker player
 Melinda Dillon, American actress (d. 2023)
 October 14 – Ralph Lauren, American fashion designer
 October 15 – Peter Gotti, American mobster (d. 2021)
 October 18 – Lee Harvey Oswald, American assassin of John F. Kennedy (d. 1963)
 October 23 – Charles R. Morris, American lawyer, banker and author (d. 2021)
 October 24 – F. Murray Abraham, American actor
 October 27 – Suzy Covey, American scholar of popular culture (d. 2007)
 October 28 – Jane Alexander, American actress
 October 30
 Leland H. Hartwell, American scientist
 Grace Slick, American rock singer (Jefferson Airplane)
 October 31 – Ron Rifkin, American actor

November

 November 1 – Barbara Bosson, American actress
 November 9 – Paul Cameron, American psychologist
 November 13 – Will Ryan, American voice actor (d. 2021)
 November 14 – Wendy Carlos, American electronic composer
 November 15
 Yaphet Kotto, African-American actor (d. 2021)
 Thalmus Rasulala, American actor (d. 1991)
 November 18
 John O'Keefe, American-born neuroscientist
 Larry Libertore, American football player (d. 2017)
 Liz J. Patterson, American politician (d. 2018)
 Brenda Vaccaro, American actress
 November 19 – Tom Harkin, American politician
 November 20 – Dick Smothers, American actor, comedian
 November 21 – Budd Dwyer, American politician (d. 1987)
 November 23 – Betty Everett, African-American soul singer, pianist (d. 2001)
 November 26 – Tina Turner, African-American singer and actress
 November 29 
 Peter Bergman, American comedian (d. 2012)
 Joel Whitburn, American author and music historian (d. 2022)

December

 December 1 – Lee Trevino, American golfer
 December 2 – Harry Reid, American politician (d. 2021)
 December 8 – Jerry Butler, African-American singer-songwriter and politician
 December 11 
 Tom Hayden, academic, activist and politician (d. 2016)
 Thomas McGuane, author and screenwriter
 December 14 – Ernie Davis, American football player (d. 1963)
 December 15 – Cindy Birdsong, African-American singer
 December 17 – Eddie Kendricks, African-American singer (The Temptations) (d. 1992)
 December 18 – Harold E. Varmus, American scientist, winner of the Nobel Prize for Medicine
 December 20 – Kathryn Joosten, American actress (d. 2012)
 December 22 – Jerry Pinkney, American illustrator of children's books (d. 2021)
 December 24 – Dean Corll, serial killer, rapist, kidnapper and torturer (k. 1973)
 December 25 
 Don Alias, jazz percussionist (d. 2006)
 Bob James, musician
 December 26 – Phil Spector, American record producer and murderer (d. 2021)
 December 27 – John Amos, African-American actor
 December 29 – Ed Bruce, American country singer and actor (d. 2021)

Undated
Michael O'Harro, American businessman

Deaths
 January 8 – Charles Eastman, Native American author, physician, reformer, helped found the Boy Scouts of America (born 1858)
 January 13 – Arthur Barker, son of Ma Barker and a member of the Barker-Karpis gang (born 1899)
 January 25 – Helen Ware, stage and screen actress (born 1877)
 January 26 – Newell Sanders, businessman and politician (born 1850)
 February 17 – Fred Gamble, actor (born 1868)
 March 19 – Lloyd L. Gaines, civil rights activist (born 1911) (disappeared, presumed dead)
 April 6 – Bennie Dickson, bank robber (date of birth unknown)
 April 28 – Anne Walter Fearn, American physician (born 1867)
 May 2 – Phillips Smalley, actor and director (born 1865)
 May 10 – James Parrott, actor (born 1898)
 May 14 – Fanny Searls, American botanist (born 1851)
 May 20 – Joseph Carr, 2nd president of the National Football League (born 1880)
 May 23 – Witmer Stone, ornithologist and botanist (born 1866)
 May 27 – Alfred A. Cunningham, first United States Marine Corps aviator (born 1882)
 May 30 – Floyd Roberts, race car driver (born 1900)
 June 4 – Tommy Ladnier, jazz trumpeter (born 1900)
 June 6 – George Fawcett, actor (born 1860)
 June 9 – Owen Moore, actor (born 1886)
 June 16 – Chick Webb, musician (born 1905)
 June 19 – Grace Abbott, social worker and activist (born 1878)
 June 28 
 James William McCarthy, judge (born 1872)
 Bobby Vernon, actor (born 1898)
 July 7 – Deacon White, baseball player and MLB Hall of Famer (born 1847)
 August 2 – Harvey Spencer Lewis, mystic (born 1883)
 August 23 – Sidney Howard, writer (born 1891)
 September 18 – Charles M. Schwab, steel magnate (born 1862)
 September 24 – James P. Boyle, politician (born 1885)
 September 26 – Kirtland Cutter, architect (born 1860)
 October 3 – Fay Templeton, musical comedy star (born 1865)
 October 6 – George Gaul, actor (born 1885)
 October 7 – Harvey Cushing, neurosurgeon (born 1869)
 October 13 – Ford Sterling, actor (born 1882)
 October 23 – Zane Grey, writer (born 1872)
 October 28 – Alice Brady, actress (born 1892)
 October 29 – Dwight B. Waldo, educator and historian (born 1864)
 November 13 – Lois Weber, actress (born 1881)
 November 16 – Pierce Butler, Associate Justice of the Supreme Court of the United States (born 1866)
 December 11 – John Harron, actor (born 1903)
 December 12 –  Charles Rudolph Walgreen, businessman (born 1873)
 December 12 – Douglas Fairbanks, actor (born 1883)
 December 19 – Reginald F. Nicholson, United States Navy admiral (born 1852)
 December 22
 Ma Rainey, blues singer (born 1886)
 December 26 – Blanche Butler Ames, First Lady of Mississippi (born 1847)

See also
 List of American films of 1939
 Timeline of United States history (1930–1949)

References

External links
 

 
1930s in the United States
United States
United States
Years of the 20th century in the United States